Serena Williams was the two-time defending champion, but she chose to participate at the Hopman Cup instead.

Maria Sharapova won the title, defeating Ana Ivanovic in the final 6–7(4–7), 6–3, 6–3.

Seeds
The top two seeds receive a bye into the second round.

Draw

Finals

Top half

Bottom half

Qualifying

Seeds

Qualifiers

Lucky loser
 Alla Kudryavtseva

Qualifying draw

First qualifier

Second qualifier

Third qualifier

Fourth qualifier

External links
 Main draw
 Qualifying draw

2015 WTA Tour
Women's Singles